Gumine Rural LLG is a local-level government (LLG) of Chimbu Province, Papua New Guinea.

Wards
01. Tagala
02. Omkolai 1
03. Omkolai 2
04. Yani
05. Milinkane
06. Bomaigaulin
07. Kipaku
08. Aleku
09. Kaleku
10. Koiyaku
11. Nigemarime
12. Gumine Stn
13. Kunarku
14. Milaku
15. Neraku
16. Egeku
17. Neraku
18. Sabamingaulin
19. Sanigekain
20. Satobuku
21. Kumaikaine

References

Local-level governments of Chimbu Province